The enzyme L-serine ammonia-lyase (EC 4.3.1.17) catalyzes the chemical reaction

L-serine = pyruvate + NH3 (overall reaction)
(1a) L-serine = 2-aminoprop-2-enoate + H2O
(1b) 2-aminoprop-2-enoate = 2-iminopropanoate (spontaneous)
(1c) 2-iminopropanoate + H2O = pyruvate + NH3 (spontaneous)
This enzyme belongs to the family of lyases, specifically ammonia lyases, which cleave carbon-nitrogen bonds.  The systematic name of this enzyme class is L-serine ammonia-lyase (pyruvate-forming). Other names in common use include serine deaminase, L-hydroxyaminoacid dehydratase, L-serine deaminase, L-serine dehydratase, and L-serine hydro-lyase (deaminating).  This enzyme participates in glycine, serine, threonine  and cysteine metabolism.  It employs one cofactor, pyridoxal phosphate.

Structural studies

References

 
 
 
 
 

EC 4.3.1
Pyridoxal phosphate enzymes
Enzymes of known structure